Salma Hale (March 7, 1787 – November 19, 1866) was an American politician, author, editor, and a United States representative from New Hampshire.

Early life
Hale was born in Alstead, Cheshire County, New Hampshire. He became apprentice as a printer at the age of thirteen and in 1805 edited the Walpole Political Observatory. He was a student of law with Roger Vose, Samuel Dinsmoor, and Phineas Handerson.

Career
Hale was appointed clerk of the court of common pleas of Cheshire County. He moved to Keene, Cheshire CountyNew Hampshire in 1813. In 1814, he served as the secretary to the commission appointed under the Treaty of Ghent for determining the northeastern boundary line of the United States.

Elected as a Democratic-Republican to the Fifteenth Congress, Hale served as United States representative for the state of New Hampshire from March 4, 1817 to March 3, 1819. He was not a candidate for renomination in 1818.

After leaving Congress, he was clerk of the New Hampshire Supreme Court from 1817 to 1834. He was admitted to the bar in October 1834. He was a member of the New Hampshire House of Representatives in 1823, 1828, and again in 1844. He also served in the New Hampshire Senate in 1824, 1825, and again in 1845 and 1846.

Death
Hale died in Somerville, Middlesex County, Massachusetts, on November 19, 1866 (age 79 years, 257 days). He is interred at Woodland Cemetery, Keene, Cheshire County, New Hampshire.

Personal life
Hale married Sarah Kellogg King on January 20, 1820, and they had three children, William King, Sarah King, and George Silsbee Hale. He was also the author of a popular early US history textbook, History of the United States of America, which was published in several editions between 1820 and 1848. The earlier editions of the book used his pseudonym, "A Citizen of Massachusetts." In the 1846 and later editions, his name is printed as the author.

References

External links

1787 births
1866 deaths
People from Alstead, New Hampshire
Democratic-Republican Party members of the United States House of Representatives from New Hampshire
19th-century American politicians